Esteve Dolsa Montaña (17 March 1936 - 22 November 2007) was an Andorran trap shooter who competed in the 1976 Summer Olympics.

Dolsa was 40 years old when he competed in the trap shooting event at the 1976 Summer Olympics with fellow countryman Joan Tomàs Roca, in the event Dolsa scored 159 points and finished in 35th position out of 43 shooters.

While out hunting on the 22 November 2007 in Lleida, he was accidentally shot and died from his wound.

References

Shooters at the 1976 Summer Olympics
1936 births
Andorran male sport shooters
Olympic shooters of Andorra
2007 deaths